Peperomia maculosa, commonly known as spotted-stalked peperomia and spotted peperomia, is a species of plant in the genus Peperomia. Its native range is from Mexico to northern South America.

Description
Visually conspicuous species with glossy large white-veined dark-green leaves that are attached to spotted petioles. The large leaves can be 15 cm or more in length and their underside is of a pale green colour. The stems are one to two cm thick, swelling at where petioles branch out. The petioles can be 15 to 20 cm long, covered in fine hair, light green spottet with purplish-brown, and grooved on the top side. The flower spikes are solitary, 20 to 30 cm long, and purplish in color.

Taxonomy
The accepted description of the plant is that of William Jackson Hooker from 1875 who examined specimens from the collections of Glasgow Botanic Gardens and the former Liverpool Botanic Gardens, today the place of Wavertree Botanic Garden and Park.

References

maculosa
Flora of Mexico
Flora of South America